Fairway is a suburb of Johannesburg, South Africa. Situated in the northern suburbs, it is found adjacent to the Wanderers Club. It is located in Region E of the City of Johannesburg Metropolitan Municipality.

History
Prior to the discovery of gold on the Witwatersrand in 1886, the suburb lay on land on one of the original farms called Syferfontein. It became a suburb on 29 June 1955 and the suburbs name originates after the nearby Wanderers Golf Club.

References

Johannesburg Region E